The Rath Packing Company was a meatpacking company located in Waterloo, Iowa, between 1891 and 1985.

Background
George John Rath (variously referred to as George Rath and John George Rath) was born in 1821 in Breitenau, Württemberg province, Germany. He came to the United States in the late 1840s and eventually settled in Dubuque, Iowa. In Dubuque, Rath began a merchant business, making and selling soap and tallow candles. He also began a pork packing operation. By 1873 he had a new partner in both endeavors: His son, E. F. (Edward Frederick) Rath, doing business under the name George Rath and Son.

In February 1891, the Rath's small pork packing plant and retail market in Dubuque was destroyed by fire. The fire came at a time when many growing towns in Iowa were trying to attract meat packers to relocate or open operations in their communities. A packing plant was a major acquisition for a small but ambitious town. Such a business meant locally-available fresh meat, employment, and typically created a livestock market, all adding to local commerce and prosperity.

The Raths were approached by the Waterloo, Iowa, Board of Trade (a Chamber of Commerce forerunner) and were eventually won over. Incentives included $10,000 in capital, land for a plant, and tax concessions. At some point during this process, George J. Rath decided not to leave Dubuque and not to continue in the meat packing business, rather to stay with his mercantile business. His son E. F. Rath, and John W. Rath, a cousin from Ackley, Iowa, began the Waterloo venture.

The Rath Packing Company
The Rath Packing Company (Rath) of Waterloo (Iowa) opened for business on November 24, 1891, on the Cedar River. Initially, the company concentrated on hogs, but by 1908 the company was also slaughtering beef and soon lamb as well. Business thrived; lucrative contracts to supply meat to the Armed Forces during both World Wars helped the company grow. Growth and profitability were also spurred between the 1930s and 1950s by innovations such as the fancy dry curing of bacon and the vacuum canning of meats. By the company's fiftieth anniversary in 1941, the small regional packing house in Waterloo had grown into the nation's single largest meatpacking facility with branch facilities in 12 states. By the end of World War II, Rath was the fifth largest meatpacker in the U.S. Through two world wars, stock market panics, depression, and drought, the company had failed to show a profit in only four of its years.

The years following World War II brought labor troubles. A 1948 strike at the Waterloo plant resulted in the death of a striking union member and a riot. Iowa National Guard troops were called in to restore order. Holding firm, Rath management eventually outlasted the union in negotiations, but labor relations remained sour.

Decline of the company
The 1960s and 1970s were difficult times for the meat packing industry. Competition was fierce and the industry had become high volume, low margin. Profitability was hurt by a decline in per capita pork consumption beginning in 1960. By the mid 1970s, Rath's 50-year-old four-story plant was obsolete. The new model for packing houses called for single-level plants with continually moving automated disassembly lines. In addition, Rath's workforce was predominantly middle-aged, older than the industry average for packing houses, and thus burdened with higher than average wage and benefit costs.

In 1980, Local 41 of the United Food and Commercial Workers Union which represented most of the labor force, negotiated a plan that, in exchange for wage and benefit concessions from the workers, gave them control of Rath's board of directors.

The employee-owned Rath operated at a loss in 1981-1983. After a series of further financial setbacks, Rath ceased operations in December, 1984 and was liquidated in 1985.

See also
Rath Packing Company Administration Building

References

External links
Historic American Engineering Record documentation, all filed under Sycamore Street between Elm & Eighteenth Streets, Waterloo, Black Hawk County, IA:

Defunct companies based in Iowa
Defunct agriculture companies of the United States
Economy of Dubuque, Iowa
Historic American Engineering Record in Iowa
Waterloo, Iowa